Acrocercops combreticola is a moth of the family Gracillariidae. It is known from South Africa.

The larvae feed on Combretum apiculatum. They mine the leaves of their host plant. The mine has the form of a large, irregular, oblong, transparent, whitish blotch-mine on the upperside of the leaf.

References

Endemic moths of South Africa
combreticola
Moths of Africa
Moths described in 1961